

2020s

2020

2021

2022

2023

References

United States women's national soccer team results